The 1st Airmobile Division was a formation of the Ukrainian Airmobile Forces from January 1, 1993, until it was disbanded in 2003. The formation was located in Bolhrad.

History 
The formation of the 1st Airmobile Division was begun by an order of the Ministry of Defence  on 5 May 1993 at Bolhrad from elements of the 98th Guards Airborne Division. Elements of the 217th Guards Airborne Regiment were used to form the 25th Airborne Brigade. Elements of the 299th Guards Airborne Regiment were used to form the 45th Airmobile Brigade. On 5 June 1993, soldiers of the division took an oath of allegiance to Ukraine. The formation of the division was completed on 1 December 1993. Between May and July 2002 the 25th Airborne Brigade moved to the village of  Hvardiiske, Novomoskovsk Raion. The division disbanded in 2003 as part of the Ukrainian military reform.

Structure 2001
The Structure of the division on January 1, 2001:
 25th Airborne Brigade – Bolhrad
 45th Airmobile Brigade – Bolhrad
27th Mechanized Brigade – Bilhorod-Dnistrovskyi
91st Artillery Regiment – Veseliy Kut
5th Separate Anti-Tank Battalion – Bolhrad
615th Separate Anti-Aircraft Battalion – Bolhrad
32nd Separate Signal Battalion – Bolhrad
95th Separate Combat Engineer Battalion – Bolhrad
857th Separate Combat Service Support Battalion – Bolhrad
356th Separate Support Battalion – Bolhrad
160th Separate Maintenance Battalion – Bolhrad

Commanders
 Major General Oleh Babich (1993–1998)
 Major General – Shamil Kuliev – (2001)
 Colonel Artur Horbenko (2002–2003)

References

Divisions of Ukraine
Military units and formations established in 1993
Military units and formations disestablished in 2003
Airborne divisions